Dark Secrets of Africa is a 1999 action video game developed by German studio New Generation Software and published by Magic Bytes for Windows. It was released on 18 August 1999.

The game sees historian Howard Hawk join Marduk and the followers of Anubis in their fight against followers of Azag-Thot.

Gamezone felt the title had enjoyable gameplay. Absolute Games gave specific praise to the special effects.

References

External links 
 
 PC Joker review
 PC Games review
 PC Action review
 PC Player review

1999 video games
Action video games
Video games developed in Germany
Video games set in Africa
Video games with isometric graphics
Windows games
Windows-only games
THQ games
Single-player video games
Magic Bytes games